Neman Grodno may refer to:

FC Neman Grodno, a Belarusian football club 
HK Neman Grodno, a Belarusian ice hockey club